Li Yifeng (born Li He, 4 May 1987) also known as Evan Li, is a Chinese actor and singer, who rose to fame after participating in the 2007 My Hero contest. He debuted as a singer in the same year, with the album Four Leaf Clover. Since 2009, he gradually shifted his career focus to acting. He is best known for his roles in television dramas Swords of Legends (2014), The Lost Tomb (2015), Noble Aspirations (2016) and Sparrow (2016); and the film Mr. Six (2015) where he won the Hundred Flowers Awards for Best Supporting Actor.

Li's booming popularity allowed him to rank 9th on Forbes China Celebrity list in 2015, 11th in 2017, and 26th in 2019.

Early life 
Li was born in Chengdu, Sichuan.

 Primary School (1994-2000): Chengdu Sanshengjie Primary School
 Junior High School (2000-2003): Chengdu Xuedao Street Middle School
Senior High School (2003-2006): Chengdu Fifth Middle School
 University (2006-2010): Department of Broadcasting and Hosting, School of Film and Television, Sichuan Normal University, graduated in July 2010 with a bachelor's degree.

Career

2007–2013: Beginnings and rising popularity
Li achieved fame in 2007 after appearing in the talent show competition, My Hero, coming in at 8th place and winning the Most Popular Contestant award. He released his first single "The One I Love Hurts Me The Most" and his first EP Four Leaf Clover in November 2007.

In 2009, Li made his acting debut in the drama The Prince of Tennis 2, adapted from the Japanese anime The Prince of Tennis. His role is the equivalent of Saeki Kojirou in the original anime. The same year, Li released his first full-length album Mr Child.

Li gained recognition after starring in the Taiwanese drama Sunny Happiness, which achieved high ratings in both Taiwan and China. He received the Best New Actor award at the 2011 China TV Drama Awards for his performance. The same year, he made his feature film debut in Lovesick, starring alongside Ariel Lin and Chen Bolin.

In 2012, Li starred in the television series White Lies and earned praise for his performance as an autistic youth. In 2013, Li starred in the romance revenge drama The Return of a Princess, and won the Best Acting Idol award at the 2013 China TV Drama Awards and the Most Popular Actor award at the 2013 LeTV Awards.

2014–2015: Breakthrough
In 2014, Li achieved breakthrough with his performance in the fantasy action drama Swords of Legends, where he portrayed the protagonist Baili Tusu. The drama was a huge success in China where it topped viewership ratings and online views. Li experienced a huge surge in popularity and commercial value, successfully breaking into the mainstream. Li became the first actor to win the Newcomer award at the 2014 Elle Style Awards. The same year, Li released his first autobiographical book entitled A Once in a Lifetime Moment.

Li further solidified his popularity with two hit dramas in 2015; period drama Legend of Fragrance and action adventure web drama The Lost Tomb where he played the role of Wu Xie, based on the popular tomb-raiding novel Daomu Biji. The same year Li took on the role of a producer for the first time, taking part in the production of outdoor variety show Lets Go! Go! Go!.

Li's next two films in 2015; coming-of-age tale Forever Young and romance drama Fall in Love Like a Star were panned by critics. He bounced back in December 2015 with a supporting role in Feng Xiaogang's crime blockbuster Mr. Six, where he plays a rebellious youth who runs away from home because of conflicts with his father and later gets into trouble with gangsters. The film topped Chinese box office charts and won critical acclaim. Li won the Best Supporting Actor award for his performance at the 33rd Hundred Flowers Awards.

Following his success, Li entered the 2015 Forbes Chinese Celebrity list for the first time, placing at 9th with an estimated revenue of 69 million yuan (10.5 million dollars; 9.6 million euros). He was also named "Most Commercially Valuable Celebrity" by CBN Weekly.

2016–present: Mainstream popularity and acclaim
In 2016, Li was appointed the Chinese Spectator Ambassador for the blockbuster film Batman v Superman: Dawn of Justice. The same month, Li the attended 2016 Style Icon Asia Awards as the only Chinese representative, and won the 2016 SIA Style Icon Award.

In 2016, Li starred as the protagonist in both seasons of Noble Aspirations, adapted from popular xianxia novel Zhu Xian.
The drama received positive reviews and surpassed 28 billion views, becoming one of the most watched Chinese dramas. He then starred in Sparrow, an espionage series set in the 1940s. The drama received critical acclaim for its performance and storyline, and became the highest rated war drama to date with a peak rating of 2.46. Li won the Best Actor award at the China TV Golden Eagle Award for his performance.

In 2017, Li starred in the suspense crime film Guilty of Mind, based on the novel Evil Minds by Lei Mi.

In 2018, Li appeared in CCTV New Year's Gala for the first time, performing the song item "The New Era of Zanzan". starred in the thriller film Animal World, based on the Japanese manga series Ultimate Survivor Kaiji. The film received positive critical reviews and topped the box office on the week of its release.

In 2020, Li starred in modern romance drama Wait in Beijing, and a hit historical spy drama Fearless Whispers. The drama received positive critical reviews and was in the Top 10 of 2020 highest-rated dramas.

In 2021, Li starred in the first Chinese rocket force themed military television series The Glory of Youth, produced by People's Liberation Army Rocket Force. He also starred in the xianxia fantasy drama Mirror: Twin cities,  

In 2022, the suspense series Day Breaker, in which Li took on the protagonist role, was released.  The drama received positive reviews, ranked 2nd on 2022 Top suspense dramas List.

Personal life 
In 2016, Yifeng admitted that he had a relationship with Lee Dahae, the Korean actress who had starred in "The Honey Party of Love" with him. He mentioned on a talk show that they were no longer together, stating "We have broken up now. When it first happened, I couldn't accept it at all." He went to Korea to look for her in an attempt to rekindle the relationship, but it was unsuccessful.

Controversy 
On 11 September 2022, Li was administratively detained by the Beijing police department for soliciting prostitution.

Filmography

Film

Television series

Short film

Variety show

Discography

Albums

Singles

Awards and nominations

Forbes China Celebrity 100

References

External links 
 
 
 Li Yifeng at chinesemov.com

1987 births
Living people
Chinese male film actors
Chinese male television actors
Chinese philanthropists
Male actors from Chengdu
Singers from Chengdu
21st-century Chinese male actors
21st-century Chinese male singers